Colcampata (Quechua qullqa, qulqa deposit, -n a suffix, pata elevated place / above, at the top / edge, bank (of a river), shore) is an archaeological site in Peru. It is situated in the Cusco Region, Cusco Province, Cusco District.

The site was declared a National Cultural Heritage of Peru by R.D N°1128-2004-INC.

See also 
 Saksaywaman

References 

Archaeological sites in Peru
Archaeological sites in Cusco Region